Scott McCrory (born February 27, 1967) is a Canadian retired professional ice hockey left winger. He was selected by the Washington Capitals in the 12th round (250th overall) of the 1986 NHL Entry Draft.

Awards and honours
Eddie Powers Memorial Trophy - OHL's Top Scorer (1986–87)
Red Tilson Trophy – OHL's Most Outstanding Player (1986–87)
William Hanley Trophy - OHL's Most Sportsmanlike Player (1986–87)
George Parsons Trophy - Memorial Cup Most Sportsmanlike Player (1987)

Career statistics

References

External links

1967 births
Baltimore Skipjacks players
Binghamton Whalers players
Canadian ice hockey centres
Essen Mosquitoes players
HC Fiemme Cavalese players
Houston Aeros (1994–2013) players
Ice hockey people from Ontario
Sportspeople from Greater Sudbury
Innsbrucker EV players
Kalamazoo Wings (1974–2000) players
Living people
Manitoba Moose (IHL) players
Oshawa Generals players
Rochester Americans players
San Francisco Spiders players
Schwenninger Wild Wings players
Washington Capitals draft picks